Pool Party is a sports simulation video game for the Wii, published by SouthPeak Games and developed by HyperDevbox Japan. It includes 13 different styles of cue sports, including nine-ball and eight-ball pool, and snooker.

Reception 

The game received "unfavorable" reviews according to the review aggregation website Metacritic. N-Europe slammed the game as "badly done shovelware" which felt like a quick cash-in on the Wii's success and control scheme. GameSpot said, "twitchy controls and poor presentation eclipse what little fun there is to be had with this middling billiards game."

References

External links 
Pool Party official page

2007 video games
Cue sports video games
Snooker video games
SouthPeak Games
Wii-only games
Multiplayer and single-player video games
Wii games